The New Zealand national cricket team toured India in  1955-56 season. The teams played five Tests. India won the series 2-0 with three Tests drawn. Before the series, the New Zealand team had played a three-Test series in Pakistan.

Squads

Every player played at least one Test in the series. Cave, Reid, Guy, Hayes, MacGibbon and Sutcliffe played all five Tests. The team was managed by Henry Cooper, who was at the time headmaster of Auckland Grammar School, and had previously played three first-class matches for Auckland.

Tour matches

Three-day: West Zone v New Zealanders

Electing to bat upon winning the toss, the New Zealanders made 162 on a grassy wicket. Harry Cave and Alex Moir offered any resistance to West Zone's bowling. In reply, West Zone lost three early wickets Nari Contractor and Bapu Nadkarni struck a 62-run partnership taking their team to 100/4 at close of play. The West Zone batsmen failed to keep up with the pace of Johnny Hayes and Tony MacGibbon, and were dismissed for 179 the following afternoon. The New Zealanders began their second innings scoring at brisk pace making 215 runs in 208 minutes. Starting the final day at 215/6, the New Zealanders lost their tail the final morning, setting West Zone a target of 252 runs to be made in 225 minutes. Captain Vinoo Mankad opening in West Zone's second innings made a fighting 103 in 210 minutes while striking partnerships with Madhav Apte and Nari Contractor that yielded 105 and 116 runs respectively. West Zone reached the target with three minutes to spare and six wickets in hand.

Three-day: South Zone v New Zealanders

Test matches

1st Test

2nd Test

3rd Test

4th Test

5th Test

References

Further reading

External links
 
 New Zealand to Pakistan & India 1955-56 at test-cricket-tours.co.uk
 

1955 in Indian cricket
1955 in New Zealand cricket
1956 in Indian cricket
1956 in New Zealand cricket
Indian cricket seasons from 1945–46 to 1969–70
International cricket competitions from 1945–46 to 1960
1955-56